The Mike Richter Award is an annual award given to the goaltender voted to be the most outstanding in Division I NCAA men's ice hockey during the regular season. The award is named in honor of former Wisconsin goaltender Mike Richter.

The inaugural winner was announced at the 2014 Frozen Four tournament held April 10–12, 2014 in Philadelphia.

Award winners

Winners by school

References

External links

College ice hockey goaltender awards in the United States

NCAA Division I ice hockey
Awards established in 2013